Käsmu is a village in Haljala Parish, Lääne-Viru County, in northern Estonia, on the territory of Lahemaa National Park. It's located northwest of Võsu, on the Käsmu Peninsula in the Gulf of Finland, surrounded by the Eru Bay to the west and the Käsmu Bay to the east.

Käsmu was first mentioned in 1453 as Kesemo, a beach belonging to the Aaspere Manor. Later in 1524 it is affirmed that Käsmu exists as a village. Due to the location the food was mostly acquired from the sea. Main fishes included Baltic herring and flounder.

In 1697 the first ship in Käsmu was built to the baron of Palmse Manor. On the 2nd half of the 19th century they started building large sailing ships in Käsmu. In 1891 a lighthouse was built. The Käsmu harbour became one of the main sites for wintering in the region. 1884–1931 a maritime school operated in Käsmu.

The summering in Käsmu started in 1840 after the owner of Aaspere Manor General Nikolai von Dellingshausen built his family summer manor there. Since then, many intellectuals and artists have stayed in Käsmu. Those celebrities include Edmund Russow, Anastasia Tsvetaeva, Peter Ustinov, Romulus Tiitus, Igor Vsevoloþski (buried in Käsmu), Nikolai Rakov, Ülo Vinter (buried in Käsmu), Arvo Pärt and Gustav Ernesaks.

Käsmu Sea Museum operates in the former cordon building since 1993. The main sights in Käsmu also include the Dellingshausen's chapel (General's Chapel) and a wooden church with churchyard.

Since 2008 a folk music festival Viru Folk is held annually all around Käsmu.

Gallery

See also
Lake Käsmu

References

External links

Käsmu Sea Museum 
Käsmu Village Society 

Villages in Lääne-Viru County